John Maguire Was an Australian former rugby league footballer who played in the 1960s and 1970s.  He played for Cronulla-Sutherland, Parramatta and St George in the New South Wales Rugby League (NSWRL)  competition. Subsequent to his career in football he became a teacher and principal.

Background
Maguire grew up in the Cronulla region and played for the Presidents Cup team before he was graded by St George as at the time Cronulla did not have a side competing in the NSWRL competition.

Playing career
Maguire made his first grade debut for St George in 1966.  Maguire was not part of the grand final winning team which defeated Balmain to win their 11th straight premiership.  In 1968, Maguire signed with Cronulla-Sutherland.  In 1973, Cronulla reached their first ever grand final against Manly-Warringah.  Maguire played in the grand final which is often remembered as one of the most brutal grand finals due to the solid defense of both teams.  Manly would go on to defeat Cronulla 10-7 in front of 52,044 at the Sydney Cricket Ground.

In the following seasons, Cronulla fell back down the ladder after the grand final defeat and Maguire left the club at the end of 1975.  In 1976, Maguire became captain-coach of Corrimal who played in the Illawarra competition.  In 1977, Maguire signed with Parramatta and mainly played for the reserve grade side.  Maguire was part of the Parramatta side which won the reserve grade grand final that year.

References

Living people
Australian rugby league coaches
Australian rugby league players
Australian schoolteachers
Cronulla-Sutherland Sharks players
Parramatta Eels players
St. George Dragons players
Rugby league second-rows
Rugby league props
Year of birth missing (living people)